El Negrito is a town, with an urban population of 12,790 (2020), and a municipality in the department of Yoro, Honduras.

Villages 
El Negrito has a total of 29 villages:

 Aldea Paujiles Norte
 Battán
 Campo Perdeíz
 Cerro Prieto No.1
 Cerro Prieto No.2
 El Jocomico
 El Junco
 El Naranjo
 El Negrito
 El Pate
 El Robledal
 El Rodeo
 Estero Indio
 Finca Treinta and Cinco
 Finca Treinta and Seis
 Guangolola 1
 Guangolola 2
 Guaymón No.1
 La Laguna
 La Majada
 La Veinte and Nueve
 La Veinte and Ocho
 Las Delicias
 Nueva San Antonio
 Samar
 San Jerónimo
 San José del Negrito
 Toyos
 Villa del Carmen and Treinta and Siete

Demographics 
At the time of the 2013 Honduras census, El Negrito municipality had a population of 45,363. Of these, 95.35% were Mestizo, 3.33% White, 1.03% Indigenous (0.50% Tolupan, 0.19% Lenca, 0.15% Chʼortiʼ, 0.11% Nahua), 0.24% Black or Afro-Honduran and 0.05% others.

References 

Municipalities of the Yoro Department